Rafael Campos (4 November 1911 – 14 December 1968) was an Argentine equestrian. He competed in two events at the 1948 Summer Olympics.

References

1911 births
1968 deaths
Argentine male equestrians
Olympic equestrians of Argentina
Equestrians at the 1948 Summer Olympics
Pan American Games medalists in equestrian
Pan American Games silver medalists for Argentina
Equestrians at the 1951 Pan American Games
Sportspeople from Córdoba, Argentina
Medalists at the 1951 Pan American Games